Richard Armitage may refer to:
 Richard Armitage (actor) (born 1971), English actor
 Richard Armitage (agent) (1928–1986), English talent agent
 Richard Armitage (government official) (born 1945), American politician and naval officer